Ellis Township may refer to the following townships in the United States:

 Ellis Township, Ellis County, Kansas
 Ellis Township, Michigan